Wine-dark sea is a traditional English translation of  (IPA: /ôi̯.nops pón.tos/), from  ("wine") +  ("eye; face"). It is an epithet in Homer of uncertain meaning: a literal translation is "wine-face sea" (wine-faced, wine-eyed). It is attested five times in the Iliad and twelve times in the Odyssey, often to describe rough, stormy seas.

History of the problem
One of the first to observe that Homer's description of colors were, by modern standards, far from accurate, was British statesman William Gladstone. In his 1858 book Studies on Homer and the Homeric Age, Gladstone analysed all aspects of Homer's mythical world, to discover a total absence of blue from the poet's descriptions of the Greek natural scenery. The word , which in later stages of Greek meant blue,  make a limited appearance, but for Homer it almost certainly meant "dark", as it was used to describe the eyebrows of Zeus. Gladstone believed that in a certain way, the Greeks of Homer's time were color blind, or rather, that the colors we recognise today are the results of a progressive education of the eye that slowly took place in the last millennium. His theories were not well received, and Time magazine wrote a harsh critique of Gladstone and his work.

Modern theories 

In the 1980s a theory gained prominence that after Greeks mixed their wine with hard, alkaline water typical for the Peloponnesus, it became darker and more of a blue-ish color. Approximately at the same time P. G. Maxwell-Stuart argued that "wine-eyed" may simply denote 'drunk, unpeaceful'.

Comparison with other ancient sources
Homer is not alone in his unusual descriptions of color. Cicero says that the sea turns purple when oars strike it. The Bible mentions a "red horse", not far from Homer's red oxen, while honey is described using variations of green in both of these texts. Most importantly, many of the world's most ancient languages lack a word for "blue", and Homer's problem seems prevalent in texts ranging from the Indian Vedas to the Icelandic Sagas. Even in modern times, tribal societies whose language appears to have changed little over time also lack a word for blue. As they can distinguish the color in tests designed for visual acuity, this absence suggests that the difference in perception might lie in the mind rather than the eyes.

Development of color terms in language

The most common explanation of this phenomenon today is that, while Greeks of Homer's day could distinguish between the colors of dark red and dark blue, they did not have words to describe this difference. Brent Berlin and Paul Kay's famous 1969 study and subsequent book Basic Color Terms was one of the more well-known exponents of this idea. Although the theory has been fine-tuned significantly in the subsequent decades, and though even the basic framework is sometimes subject to significant controversy, Berlin and Kay's work helps explain why colors in many ancient literary works seem to work differently than in modern languages. They hypothesized that early in a language's development of color terminology, languages would only have a few words for basic colors: beginning with only two words for light and dark, and subsequently developing words for reddish and bluish colors, before they eventually accrued nearly a dozen words to segment up the color wheel into finer gradations. Therefore, Homer's inability to distinguish semantically between the color of wine and the color of the sea is not only common to many other ancient Greek writers, but even to many other languages existing in the world today.

Popular culture references
Homer's translated phrase has been used by other authors.
 The Wine-Dark Sea. Robert Aickman. 1988
 The Wine-Dark Sea. Patrick O'Brian. 1993
 The Port-Wine Sea, A Parody. Susan Wenger. 1999. (A parody of O'Brian's character Capt. Jack Aubrey.)

See also

References

Citations

Phrases and idioms derived from Greek mythology
Homeric style
Homer
Seas
Ancient wine
Color names